Gunungrejo is a village in the Way Ratai, Pesawaran, Pesawaran Regency, Lampung Province, Indonesia. It was initially a hamlet in Desa Wates Way Ratai.

History 
Initially Gunungrejo was a hamlet in Desa Wates Way Ratai which know as ANGLO (AFDELING name in Way Ratai rubber plantation). In 23 October 1986, Dusun Gunungrejo officially reformed to  a new administrative district of Desa persiapan Gunungrejo, which contains 12 Dusun: Kalipasir I, Kalipasir II, Gunungrejo, Kaliawi, Fajarbulan, Gunungsari, Lebaksari, Tamansari, Totoharjo, Merawan, Sidorejo and Candipuro.

In 2013, Desa Gunungrejo reformed into 3 village:

 Desa Gunungrejo
 Desa Mulyosari
 Desa Poncorejo

Headman

Dusun 
There are 9 Dusun in Desa Gunungrejo:

 Dusun Ngadirejo
 Dusun Kalipasir
 Dusun Gunungrejo 1
 Dusun Gunungrejo 2
 Dusun Kaliawi
 Dusun Tegalrejo
 Dusun Talangbandung
 Dusun Candisari 1
 Dusun Candisari 2

Demographic 
Desa Gunungrejo borders:

North: Forest of Pesawaran Mountain

South: Desa Poncorejo, Kecamatan Way Ratai

East: Desa Mulyosari, Kecamatan Way Ratai

West: Desa Babakan Loa, Kecamatan Kedondong

Desa Gunungrejo covered hills and mountains with 400 - 500 MSL in height and 1343,41 Ha in width.

Educational Facility 

 PAUD Miftahul Huda
 Sekolah Dasar Negeri 7 Way Ratai
 Sekolah Dasar Negeri 14 Way Ratai
 Sekolah Dasar Negeri 21 Way Ratai
 Madrasah tsanawiyah Al-ikhlas
 Madrasah aliyah Al-ikhlas
 Madrasah ibtidaiyah Nurul Huda
 Madrasah tsanawiyah Nurul Huda
 Madrasah aliyah Nurul Huda

References

External links
 Site (in Indonesian)

Populated places in Lampung
Lampung

id:Kategori:Way Ratai, Pesawaran